James Welch (March 17, 1938 — October 25, 2017) was a professional American football player who played nine seasons in the NFL.

References

External links
 Football Database

1938 births
2017 deaths
People from Anson, Texas
Players of American football from Texas
American football defensive backs
Abilene High School (Abilene, Texas) alumni
SMU Mustangs football players
Baltimore Colts players
Detroit Lions players